The 2004 West Virginia gubernatorial election took place on November 2, 2004 for the post of Governor of West Virginia. Democratic Secretary of State of West Virginia Joe Manchin defeated Republican Monty Warner. Manchin won all but 3 counties. Despite Democratic presidential nominee John Kerry losing the state to George W. Bush by double digits in the concurrent presidential election, Manchin won by nearly 30 points.

Democratic primary

Candidates
Jerry Baker
James A. Baughman, former State Senator
Louis J. Davis, candidate in 1996
Phillip Frye, husband of incumbent governor's mistress
Lloyd G. Jackson II, former State Senator
Jim Lees, attorney and candidate for governor in 1996 and 2000
Joe Manchin, West Virginia Secretary of State and candidate for governor in 1996
Lacy W. Wright, Jr., former State Senator

Campaign
Democratic governor Bob Wise became the first governor of West Virginia not to stand for re-election since the Constitution of West Virginia was amended in 1970 to permit two consecutive terms. In August 2003 he announced that he would not stand again after admitting to an affair with a West Virginia Development Office employee Angela Mascia who was also married. The announcement took place three months after this became public knowledge and over 500 emails exchanged between the two was released to the public through a Freedom of Information Act request. Angela Mascia's then husband, Phillip Frye, divorced Mascia and then ran for Governor. Frye told The Daily Show in August 2003 that he was running “to be a sheer nuisance to Bob Wise” and "I'm not qualified to run our great state, or have any hopes whatsoever of winning an election."

West Virginia Secretary of State Joe Manchin challenged Wise for the Democratic nomination, and after Wise withdrew from the race he became the favorite for the primary. Manchin lined up support from various sources including labour leaders in order to reverse his defeat in the gubernatorial primary in 1996. His main opponent in the primary was former State Senator Lloyd Jackson, who launched his campaign with a plan to reduce insurance costs. In the run up to the primary the two candidates traded negative advertising but Manchin won an easy victory in the primary on May 11.

Results

Republican primary

Candidates
Carroll B. Bowden, Sr.
Rob Capehart, former West Virginia Secretary of Tax and Revenue
Larry Faircloth, State Delegate
Douglas McKinney, physician
Dan Moore, banker and car dealership owner
Joseph Oliverio, construction executive
James D. Radcliffe, Jr.
Charles D. Railey
Richard Robb, Mayor of South Charleston
Monty Warner, businessman

Campaign
The Republican primary saw 10 candidates competing for the nomination. Six of the candidates met in a debate in March 2004, in which they agreed on the need to reduce the size of the West Virginia state government. It saw a close race between three main candidates Monty Warner, a retired army colonel and developer, Rob Capehart, a former state tax secretary, and Dan Moore, a former banker and car dealer. A poll conducted during the lead-up to the primary showed the three candidates virtually even. Warner won a narrow victory in the primary over Moore and Capehart.

Results

General election

Campaign
Early in the campaign, Warner called for Manchin, as a centrist Democrat, to endorse President George W. Bush for re-election over his Democratic rival John Kerry. Manchin's campaign spokesperson responded that Manchin backed "the Democratic nominee".

The two main candidates faced each other in three debates and one town hall meeting. Jesse Johnson, the Mountain Party candidate, unsuccessfully attempted to get the West Virginia Supreme Court to cancel the first debate, as he was not asked to take part.

Manchin had an edge in the election with better name recognition and a strong financial advantage over Warner. In the closing weeks of the election campaign, Manchin spent $3.3 million against $880,000 by Warner.

Predictions

Results

References

See also

West Virginia
2004
Gubernatorial